The 2015 ADAC Procar Series is the twenty-first season of the ADAC Procar Series, the German championship for touring cars. For this season Super 2000 cars were banned. The season consisted of eight separate race weekends with two races each, spread over eight different tracks.

Teams and drivers

Race calendar and results

Championship standings

Drivers' Championship

References

External links
 Official ADAC Procar Series website

ADAC Procar Series
ADAC Procar Series seasons